The 1965 NCAA University Division Golf Championship was the 27th annual NCAA-sanctioned golf tournament to determine the individual and team national champions of men's collegiate golf in the United States.

The tournament was held at the Holston Hills Country Club in Knoxville, Tennessee, hosted by the University of Tennessee.

Defending champions Houston won the team title, the Cougars' eighth NCAA team national title.

This was the first NCAA tournament decided by stroke play and the first without a tournament medalist.

Individual results

Individual champion
 Marty Fleckman, Houston

Team results

Note: Top 10 only
DC = Defending champions

References

NCAA Men's Golf Championship
Golf in Tennessee
NCAA Golf Championship
NCAA Golf Championship
NCAA Golf Championship